Deoxy sugars are sugars that have had a hydroxyl group replaced with a hydrogen atom.

Examples include:
 Deoxyribose, or 2-deoxy-D-ribose, a constituent of DNA
 Fucose, or 6-deoxy-L-galactose, main component of fucoidan of brown algae, and present in N-linked glycans
 Fuculose, or 6-deoxy-L-tagatose, one of the important components of avian influenza virus particles
 Rhamnose, or 6-deoxy-L-mannose, present in plant glycosides

In Escherichia coli bacteria, deoxyribose sugars are synthesized via two different pathways - one pathway involves aldol condensation, whereas the other pathway is conversion of a ribose sugar into a deoxyribose sugar by means of changes on the nucleotide or nucleoside level. Deoxyribose is synthesized through the reduction of ribose. Deoxyribose is derived from the same precursor as ribose being that the reduction of the sugar with the extra hydroxyl group results in the deoxy-sugar, which has its hydroxyl group replaced with a hydrogen atom.

Dideoxy sugars 
Some biologically important dideoxy sugars, sugars that have had two hydroxyl groups replaced with hydrogen atoms, include colitose and abequose.

See also
Deoxynucleotide

References

External links
 
 Overview at qmul.ac.uk